George William Hoban (September 27, 1890 – February 2, 1943) was an American football player, coach, and official.  He served as the head football coach at Lehigh University for one season in 1942, compiling a record of 5–2–1.  Hoban played football there as a Halfback at Lehigh from 1912 to 1914 before graduation in 1915.  During World War I he coached team for the 304th Infantry Regiment and at Camp Devens.  After working for Bethlehem Steel in Sparrows Point, Maryland, Hoban moved to the Friends School of Baltimore in 1921 to teach history and coach.  In 1922, he moved to St. John's College in Annapolis, Maryland.  Hoban died on February 2, 1943, in Bethlehem, Pennsylvania, of a heart attack while driving his car.

Head coaching record

College

References

1890 births
1943 deaths
Bethlehem Steel people
20th-century American educators
American football halfbacks
American football officials
Schoolteachers from Pennsylvania
Dartmouth Big Green football players
Lehigh Mountain Hawks football coaches
Lehigh Mountain Hawks football players
St. John's Johnnies football coaches
High school football coaches in Maryland
People from Claremont, New Hampshire
Players of American football from New Hampshire